Cape Verdeans, also called Cabo Verdeans, are a creole ethnic group native to Cape Verde, an island nation in West Africa consisting of an archipelago in the central Atlantic Ocean. Cape Verde is a multi-ethnic society, which means that it is home to people of many different ethnic backgrounds. Cabo Verdeans do not consider their nationality as an ethnicity but as a citizenship with various ethnicities.

Ethnic groups
The Cape Verde archipelago was uninhabited when the Portuguese landed there in 1456. Slaves and Arabs from adjacent West Africa were brought to the islands to work on Portuguese plantations. As a result, many Cape Verdeans, are of mixed ethnicity (mestiços in Portuguese). European ancestors also include Italian, and French. The last time Cape Verde counted racial origin was in the 1950 census.

Italian seamen who were granted land by the Portuguese Empire, were followed by Portuguese settlers, exiles, and Portuguese Jews (lançados) who were victims of the Inquisition. Many foreigners from other parts of the world settled in Cape Verde as their permanent country. Most of them were Dutch, French, British, Spanish, or the English, as well as Arabs and Jews (from Lebanon and Morocco).

The most important ethnic roots for Cape Verde based on historically known presence, cultural retention and ancestral connections are those of the Mandinga, Wolof, Biafada, Papel and Bainouk ethnicities, while the remaining suspected ethnicities will show much variation in actual contributions to Cape Verde's ethnogenesis. But for each of them there is some kind of historical testimony to their presence in Cape Verde, which are the Fula, Sereer, Diola, Cassanga, Basari/Tenda, Balanta, Bijagos, Nalu, Cocoli, Baga, Susu, Jallonké, Bambara and Sape.

Diaspora                                  

Prior to independence in 1975, many thousands of people emigrated from drought-stricken Portuguese Cape Verde, formerly an overseas province of Portugal. Because these people arrived using their Portuguese passports, they were registered as Portuguese immigrants by the authorities. Today, more Cape Verdeans live abroad than in Cape Verde itself, with significant emigrant Cape Verdean communities in Brazil and in the United States (102,000 of Cape Verdeans descent in the U.S., with a major concentration on the New England coast from Providence, Rhode Island, to New Bedford, Massachusetts).
 
In 2008, Portugal’s National Statistics Institute estimated that there were 68,145 Cape Verdeans who legally resided in Portugal.  This made up "15.7% of all foreign nationals living legally in the country."

Languages
Cape Verde's official language is Portuguese. It is the language of instruction and government.

Cape Verdean Creole is used colloquially, and is the mother tongue of virtually all Cape Verdeans. Cape Verdean Creole or Kriolu is a dialect continuum of a Portuguese-based, that came from Guiné Bissau  creole. There is a substantial body of literature in Creole, especially in the Santiago Creole and the São Vicente Creole. Creole has been gaining prestige since the nation's independence from Portugal.

Religion

More than 80% of the population of Cape Verde is nominally Roman Catholic, according to an informal poll taken by local churches. About 5% of the population is Protestant. The largest Protestant denomination is the Church of the Nazarene.

Other religious groups include the Seventh-day Adventist Church, the Church of Jesus Christ of Latter-day Saints (Mormons), the Assemblies of God, the Universal Church of the Kingdom of God, the New Apostolic Church, and various other Pentecostal and evangelical groups. There are also small Baháʼí communities and a small Muslim community. The number of atheists is estimated at less than 1 percent of the population.

Culture

The culture of Cape Verde reflects its mixed West African and Portuguese roots. It is well known for its diverse forms of music such as Morna, and a wide variety of dances: the soft dance Morna, the Funaná, the extreme sensuality of coladeira, and the Batuque dance. These are reflective of the diverse origins of Cape Verde's residents. The term "Criolo", or also "Kriolu" is used to refer to residents as well as the culture of Cape Verde.

See also
 List of Cape Verdeans
 Cape Verdean diaspora where there are lists of more people of Cape Verdean descent around the world

References

Bibliography

 
Ethnic groups in Cape Verde
Multiracial affairs in Africa
Mulatto